Raymond Johansen (born 14 February 1961) is a Norwegian politician for the Labour Party who has been Governing Mayor of Oslo since 2015. A former member of the Socialist Left Party, Johansen previously served as the Oslo city commissioner for transport and environment from 1992 to 1995, when his party withdrew from the city cabinet. After joining Labour, he served as the party secretary from 2009 to 2015.

Early life and education 

Johansen was born in Oslo and was a plumber by trade.

Career

Early career
Originally a member of the Socialist Left Party, he chaired their youth wing Socialist Youth from 1986 to 1988 and was a member of the central party board from 1986 to 1991. He chaired the local party chapter in Oslo from 1990 to 1991, and was city commissioner (byråd) of the environment and transport in the city government of Oslo from 1991 to 1995. He was not re-elected in 1995, and left the Socialist Left Party.

He then worked in the Norwegian Agency for Development Cooperation from 1996 to 2000 and was secretary general of the Norwegian Refugee Council from 2002 to 2005. In 2002 he briefly worked at the Norwegian embassy in Asmara. During the first and second cabinet Stoltenberg he was State Secretary in the Ministry of Foreign Affairs.

On 18 March 2007, Johansen met with members of the newly elected Hamas unity government and announced that Norway would resume economic aid. He also expressed hope that other European states would follow their lead.

Labour Party Secretary
On 21 April 2009, he was elected as Party Secretary of the Labour Party on its national convention, following the footsteps of his uncle, Thorbjørn Berntsen. The position is traditionally both powerful and influential. He was sometimes mentioned in party circles as a possible candidate to succeed  party leader Jens Stoltenberg, but did not forward his candidacy and Stoltenberg was subsequently succeeded by Jonas Gahr Støre.

Governing Mayor of Oslo
Following the 2015 local elections he became governing mayor of Oslo, leading a coalition with the Socialist Left Party and the Green Party.

On 30 April 2018, Johansen took part in a Dagsrevyen debate with the Minister of Justice, Tor Mikkel Wara, regarding immigration in Oslo. Wara notably blamed gang criminality on the increase of immigration in the capital. Wara further added that gang issues was attributed to ethnic and cultural issues, and that it was the reason for why it was important to stop immigration in Oslo. Johansen defended the city's handling of immigration, citing increase in borough spending and the strengthening of kindergartens and better opportunities to learn Norwegian.

Johansen was re-elected following the 2019 local elections, and presented his new city commissioners on 23 October.

In June 2021, following a motion of no confidence against City Commissioner for Transport and the Environment Lan Marie Berg, Johansen put forward the cabinet question in Oslo's city council, which was supported by the opposition parties. He expressed that he wanted to continue a coalition with the Socialist Left and Green Party should he continue to lead the council cabinet.

On 21 June, mayor of Oslo Marianne Borgen gave Johansen the green light to form a new city council cabinet, after the opposition, led by the Conservative Party, failed to seek enough support for a Conservative led cabinet.
Johansen presented his second cabinet on 24 June, with the only change being Sirin Hellvin Stav who succeeded Lan Marie Berg as commissioner for transport and the environment.

In early January 2022, he criticised the government for being unclear its handling of COVID-19. He also asked the health services to document hospitalisations and hospitals' capacity; and that municipalities should be in charge of measures themselves, including the temporary halt on alcohol beverages.

On 3 October, he announced that he would be seeking re-election for a third term in the 2023 local elections.

Personal life
He is married to Christin Kristoffersen and have two children, and resides in Oslo.  From 1999 to 2001 he was a member of the board of Vålerenga Fotball.

References

1961 births
Living people
Socialist Left Party (Norway) politicians
Labour Party (Norway) politicians
Politicians from Oslo
Norwegian state secretaries
Plumbers